Goran Ivanišević was the defending champion, but lost in the final to Franco Davín. The score was 6–2, 6–4.

Seeds

Draw

Finals

Top half

Bottom half

References

External links
 Official results archive (ATP)
 Official results archive (ITF)

1994 Singles
Singles
1994 in Romanian tennis